III is the third  album released by the R&B band The S.O.S. Band on the Tabu label in October 1982.  It was produced by Ricky Sylvers and Gene Dozier.

History
The album peaked at #27 on the R&B albums chart. It also reached #172 on the Billboard 200. The album yielded two Billboard R&B chart singles, "High Hopes" and "Have It Your Way", each peaking at #25 and #57 respectively. "High Hopes" also reached #49 on the Hot Dance Club Play chart. The third single, "Groovin' (That's What We're Doin')", peaked at #47 on the Hot Dance Club Play chart and #72 on the UK Singles Chart.

"High Hopes" is notable for being the first collaboration between the group and Jimmy Jam and Terry Lewis, who would go on to write and produce several hits for the group. The album was digitally remastered and reissued on CD with bonus tracks in 2013 by Demon Music Group.

Track listing

Personnel
The S.O.S. Band
Mary Davis – lead vocals, background vocals
Jason Bryant – keyboards, vocoder, lead vocals, background vocals
Abdul Ra'oof – trumpet, flugelhorn, percussion, lead vocals, background vocals
Billy Ellis – saxophone
John Simpson – bass, background vocals
Bruno Speight – rhythm guitar, lead guitar, background vocals
Jerome "JT" Thomas – drums, percussion
Willie "Sonny" Killebrew – saxophone

Additional Personnel
William Shelby, Leon F. Sylvers III, Joey Gallo – keyboards
Crystal McCarey, Ricky Sylvers, Gene Dozier – background vocals

Production
Ricky Sylvers, Gene Dozier – producers
Leon F. Sylvers – executive producer
Ron Christopher – recording engineer
Steve Hodge – recording engineer, mixing engineer
Wally Traugott – mastering engineer
Diem Jones – photography
Jones & Armitage – design

Charts
Albums

Singles

References

External links
 III at Discogs

1982 albums
Tabu Records albums
The S.O.S. Band albums